Matthias Holst (born 19 June 1982 in Husum) is a German footballer who currently plays for Rödemisser SV.

References 

1982 births
Living people
People from Husum
German footballers
Association football defenders
2. Bundesliga players
3. Liga players
Hamburger SV II players
FC Rot-Weiß Erfurt players
SC Paderborn 07 players
FC Hansa Rostock players
Footballers from Schleswig-Holstein